The Hattah-Kulkyne National Park is a national park in the Mallee district of Victoria, Australia. It is a popular destination for bushwalkers and school camping trips.

History
In 1915, a sanctuary was formed to protect the beauty of the Hattah lakes. In 1949, ornithologist Les Chandler and the Reverend Clarrie Lang formed the Sunraysia Field Naturalists' Club (later the Sunraysia Naturalists' Research Trust). Les Chandler was variously its president, vice-president, secretary, treasurer and editor. They agitated to have the Hattah-Kulkyne area declared a national park, which was partially achieved in 1960, with the Hattah Lakes area becoming the Hattah Lakes National Park. The Kulkyne State Forest was added to the national park in 1980, resulting in the creation of the Hattah-Kulkyne National Park.

Description
The park is in the Mallee district, famous for its red dirt and mallee eucalypts. There are several lakes in the area, the largest of which is Lake Hattah. During the dry season most of the lakes and their streams dry out completely. Although there are limited road and tracks, there are several major high tension power and telegraph lines that run through or near the park, around which large areas are cleared. For management purposes, the Hattah-Kulkyne National Park is managed with the Murray-Sunset National Park, Wyperfeld National Park, Lake Albacutya Park and Murray-Kulkyne Park as part of the Victorian Mallee Parks.

Important Bird Area
Over 200 bird species have been recorded in the park, which is overlapped by the Murray-Sunset, Hattah and Annuello Important Bird Area (IBA), so identified by BirdLife International because it contains mallee habitat supporting a suite of threatened mallee bird, including the malleefowl, black-eared miner and mallee emu-wren.

See also

 Protected areas of Victoria
Hattah-Kulkyne and Murray-Kulkyne Biosphere Reserve

References

External links

National parks of Victoria (Australia)
Mallee (Victoria)
Protected areas established in 1960
Ramsar sites in Australia
1960 establishments in Australia
Mallee Woodlands and Shrublands
Murray-Darling basin